Patrick Ryan is a member of the States of Jersey, and was first elected as a Deputy of St Helier No. 1 district in 2001.

He is the Minister for Education, Sport and Culture.

See also
Council of Ministers of Jersey

References

Living people
Deputies of Jersey
Government ministers of Jersey
Year of birth missing (living people)